Francisco Aguilar y Leal (1776–1840) was a soldier and Spanish merchant, that became one of the main leaders of Uruguayan independence.

Life and the military 
Francisco Aguilar y Leal was born in 1776 in Santa Cruz de Tenerife, Canary Islands,
Spain. Later, he moved to Arrecife, in the island of Lanzarote, where, in the early nineteenth century, he chartered an expedition of 200 people from the island bound for Montevideo, Uruguay, starting the Canarian emigration from the eastern islands to that place (after the Canary emigration that took place in Uruguay in the first half of the eighteenth century), which basically will not terminate until 1900, emigrating more than 10,000 people in this period. He worked as a Merchant in the Canary Island. Later, he moved to Maldonado, Uruguay, arriving with a lot of money from the Canary island. Here, he continued working as a trader and cemented a fortune in the agricultural businesses, commercial and industrial: His ships performed the traffic in goods imports and exports, with trade contacts with London, Brazil and the United States. He also won the concession of the exploitation of seals and whales, whose leather in the first case, and oils have a strong demand abroad. He served this office for twelve years. On the other hand, he was one of people those most fought for the release of Uruguay, presenting important services to the struggle for independence: He supported the Revolution of 1811 and be revealed in 1812 against the Luso-Brazilian domination. He paid the company of the Treinta y Tres (Thirty-Threean) and he led an army that participated in it. Later, between 1835 and 1840, he was Minister of Finance of the Republic. During these moments he fought in all the progressives works of Maldonado of his time, which promoted their port, agriculture and industry. He died in Montevideo in 1840.

Personal life 
In regard to their productive activities in Uruguayan territory, he excelled in the creation of a factory of tile and ceramics and in the introduction of new crops in Maldonado. He had also salt and brick factories for construction factories. In his vast property he cultivated cereal, vegetables and vines. He had also farms of cows, horses and merino sheep.

References

External links 
 http://www.redargentina.com/comun/efemerides/UruguayIndependencia.asp. Independencia de Uruguay (Independence of Uruguay).

Uruguayan independence activists
People from Santa Cruz de Tenerife
Spanish emigrants to Uruguay
Uruguayan people of Canarian descent
1776 births
1840 deaths
19th-century Spanish businesspeople